The Real Estate Roundtable is a non-profit public policy think tank based in Washington, D.C. that represents the interests of real estate. It develops public policy agendas pertaining to tax, capital and credit, environment and energy, and homeland security.

History
In 1999, the National Realty Committee (NRC) became The Real Estate Roundtable. In 1985 the NRC had 280 member organizations comprised of property developers, banks, insurance companies, brokerages and accounting concerns.

The Real Estate Roundtable announced its formation of the Real Estate ISAC (RE-ISAC), an Information Sharing and Analysis Center, in February 2003.

Jeffrey D. DeBoer has served as the president and CEO of The Real Estate Roundtable since its formation. Randall K. Rowe was elected chairman in 1998. John F. Fish became the chairman in 2021.

Activities
The Real Estate Roundtable holds four annual meetings in Washington, D.C. and publishes a weekly electronic newsletter, "Policy Toolkits and Fact Sheets", and its Annual Report and Policy Agenda.

Activities of the organization are divided amongst its committees:

Equity, Diversity, and Inclusion (ED&I)
Homeland Security Task Force (HSTF)
Real Estate Capital Policy Advisory (RECPAC)
Research
Sustainability Policy Advisory (SPAC)
Tax Policy Advisory

The organization was a member of the Economic Growth Alliance in the 1990s. In 2023, it became one of seven real estate trade association member organizations composing the Commercial Real Estate Diverse Supplier (CREDS) Consortium.

In 2017, the organization opposed the full-expensing of structures proposed under the Tax Cuts and Jobs Act (TCJA), arguing for real estate investment to be "demand-driven, not tax-driven."

On January 8, 2020, the organization issued a statement strongly denouncing the January 6 United States Capitol attack.

The Real Estate Roundtable wrote to U.S. President Joe Biden in December 2022, urging the federal government to both influence a greater return to office work from remote work, and to expedite under-used office space conversions for housing.

Membership
Since 2021, 67% of the organization is composed of members from public and privately owned real estate enterprises. An additional 20% of members are connected to financial services, 3% are asset managers, and 10% are real estate trade associations.

Membership is by invitation and is divided between two tiers, Roundtable and President's Council, each with a cap of 100 members. Membership in Roundtable is offered to leaders of national real estate entities or major real estate trade associations. All four annual meetings are open to members of the Roundtable. Membership of the President's Council is also offered to industry leaders, but those whose operations may be more regional. These members are invited to two of the annual meetings, the Annual Meeting and the State of the Industry meeting.

See also
National Association of Realtors
Urban Land Institute

References

External links
The Real Estate Roundtable

Real estate in the United States
Non-profit organizations based in Washington, D.C.
Real estate industry trade groups
Trade associations based in the United States